Jorge Leonardo Arias Mujica (born 24 July 1952) is a Chilean former footballer who played as a midfielder for clubs in Chile and Spain.

Club career
As a child, Arias was with club Lautaro from  neighborhood. He came to Magallanes at the age of fourteen and made his debut in 1972. He also played for Independiente de Cauquenes and Audax Italiano in the second level.

After playing for Magallanes, he joined Spanish side Levante UD thanks to his compatriot Carlos Caszely and spent three seasons with them, making seven appearances and scoring two goals in the 1976–77 season.

Back in Chile, he played for Unión Española, Deportes Ovalle, Ñublense, Green Cross-Temuco and Magallanes again.

He ended his career playing for Good Year from Maipú and Deportes Maipo in the Chilean Tercera División.

But, he returned to play in 1992 for Municipal Talagante, Magallanes, Deportes Antofagasta and Santiago Wanderers. In 1995, he led Magallanes at the age of forty three as the team captain in the league title of the Chilean Tercera División, alongside players such as Darío Scatolaro, Carlos Vega and Cristian Olivares.

International career
Arias represented Chile at under-20 level in the 1971 South American Championship with Fernando Riera as coach.

Personal life
He has seven siblings and five of them were footballers who played for Magallanes: Juan, Antonio, a Chile international, Óscar, Enrique and Miguel Ángel.

References

External links
 
 Jorge Arias at BDFutbol.com 
 Jorge Arias at PlaymakerStats.com

1952 births
Living people
Footballers from Santiago
Chilean footballers
Chilean expatriate footballers
Chile under-20 international footballers
Chilean Primera División players
Primera B de Chile players
Tercera División de Chile players
Deportes Magallanes footballers
Independiente de Cauquenes footballers
Audax Italiano footballers
Unión Española footballers
Deportes Ovalle footballers
Ñublense footballers
Deportes Temuco footballers
Magallanes footballers
C.D. Antofagasta footballers
Santiago Wanderers footballers
Tercera División players
Segunda División players
Levante UD footballers
Chilean expatriate sportspeople in Spain
Expatriate footballers in Spain
Association football midfielders